Sir Anthony Denny (16 January 1501 – 10 September 1549) was  Groom of the Stool to King Henry VIII of England, thus his closest courtier and confidant. He was the most prominent member of the Privy chamber in King Henry's last years, having together with his brother-in-law, John Gates, charge of the "dry stamp" of the King's signature, and attended the King on his deathbed. He was a member of the Reformist circle that offset the conservative religious influence of Bishop Gardiner. He was a wealthy man, having acquired several manors and former religious sites distributed by the Court of augmentations after the Dissolution of the Monasteries. By 1548, he was keeper of the Palace of Westminster.

Life

Anthony Denny was the second son of Sir Edmund Denny (d. 22 December 1520), a Baron of the Exchequer, by his second wife, Mary Troutbeck, the daughter and coheir of Robert Troutbeck of Bridge Trafford, Chester. He had an elder brother, Sir Thomas Denny, of Bury St Edmunds, Suffolk, who married Elizabeth Monoux, the daughter of Sir George Monoux, Lord Mayor of London, as well as two younger brothers and ten sisters, including Martha.

Denny was educated at St Paul's School and St John's College, Cambridge. In 1544, he was knighted. In 1547, he was elected knight of the shire (MP) for Hertfordshire.

Along with Edward Seymour, Earl of Hertford, John Dudley, Viscount Lisle, and Sir William Paget, Denny helped to finalise King Henry VIII's will upon his deathbed in 1547. Denny specifically argued to the King on several occasions against the removal of Bishop Gardiner from the will. Denny was himself the man to tell King Henry of his coming death, advising the old King "to prepare for his final agony". His position gave him both the power to control who saw King Henry VIII in his last years (in which he spent excessive time in the Privy Chambers), and the power to influence, through his personal relationship with the ageing King. Along with Sir William Paget, the Principal Secretary, Denny is suspected of having fixed the choosing of the "Progressive" appeals, headed by Edward Seymour.

In 1525, Denny married Joan Champernowne, the daughter of Sir Philip Champernowne, and the close friend of King Henry VIII's wife, Queen Catherine Parr. She was the sister of Katherine, governess of the future Queen Elizabeth I. With Joan, Denny had 12 children, including:
 Henry Denny, Dean of Chester (d. 24 March 1574). He married, firstly, Honory Grey, daughter of William Grey, 13th Baron Grey de Wilton and Lady Mary Somerset. Their son was Edward Denny, 1st Earl of Norwich. His second wife was Elizabeth Grey, by whom he had a son, who died unmarried.
 Sir Edward Denny, Knight Banneret of Bishops Stortford 1547–1599, who married Margaret Edgcumbe, daughter of Sir Piers Edgcumbe (1536 - c.1607), by whom he had issue.
 Mary Denny, who married Thomas Astley of Writtle, one of the grooms of the Privy Chamber to Elizabeth I.

See also
 Hans Holbein the Younger

Notes

References

External links 
 Sir Anthony Denny, Knight
 Sir Anthony Denny (1501–1549), Courtier to King Henry VIII: Sitter associated with 3 portraits (National Portrait Gallery)

1501 births
1549 deaths
People educated at St Paul's School, London
English MPs 1547–1552
Alumni of St John's College, Cambridge
Anthony
Knights banneret of England
English knights
Grooms of the Stool
Court of Henry VIII